San Borja is the second municipal section of the José Ballivián Province in the Beni Department of Bolivia. The seat of the municipality is the town of San Borja.

Languages 
The languages spoken in the San Borja Municipality are mainly Spanish, Chimane, Aymara and Quechua.

References 

 www.ine.gov.bo - Instituto Nacional de Estadística de Bolivia (INE)
 www.enlared.org.bo
 obd.descentralizacion.gov.bo

External links 
 Map of José Ballivián province

Municipalities of Beni Department